Ninedee is a Swedish industrial/metal/crossover band founded by former Shield guitarist Marcus Eriksson in 1998.

Discography

ALBUM

I En Värld Av Hat
Nailed to the Cross
999
We Were Gods
Jag Älskade Er Av Kärlek En Gång
Judge
Centipede
Ignoransens Högborg
I Dream of Nothing
Thorns Shall Grow
När Ljuset Slocknar
Där Ondskan Möter Oss

Releasedate: 2018.09.09
Media: DIGI, Vinyl LP
Catnr: DNS110
Additional information: Vinyl LP, edition limited to 99 copies (180 g). Comes with 20 x 20 cm booklet.

EP

Thorns Shall Grow
 Thorns Shall Grow
 Are Demons My Angels
 Skymning

Releasedate: 2014.09.09
Media: DIGI
Catnr: DNS107

We Were Gods
 We Were Gods
 Turning Point

Releasedate: 2014.05.15
Media: DIGI
Catnr: DNS106

Infusco
 Antebellum
 Ora Pro Nobis
 Mors Ianua Vitae

Releasedate: 2012.08.01
Media: DIGI
Catnr: DNS102

Egoism
 Bleeding
 Consumed
 Rise
 Faces
 Miss Wannabe

Releasedate: 2010.12.23
Media: CD, DIGI
Catnr: DNS101
Additional information: CD, edition limited to 500 copies, individually numbered.

Discipline
 Alone
 Filter
 Turning Point
 Miss Wannabe
 Manifesto

Releasedate: 2004.01.01
Media: CD
Catnr: DNSP01
Additional information: -

Other releases

När Ljuset Slocknar
 Nailed to the Cross
 We Were Gods
 Ignoransens Högborg
 När Ljuset Slocknar

Releasedate: 2018.01.10
Media: Cassette
Catnr: DNSP02
Additional information: Edition limited to 50 copies.

CAS9D (split)
 Chaos All Stars – The Contract (featuring Kya Wolfwritten)
 Chaos All Stars – Volcano (Remixed by Ninedee)
 Chaos All Stars – Influx (Autumn Light Festival Version)
 Ninedee – Lies
 Ninedee – Consumed (Remixed by Chaos All Stars)
 Ninedee – Mental

Releasedate: 2011.10.10
Media: 12" Vinyl
Catnr: EPOS1101
Additional information: 12" clear vinyl, edition limited to 200 copies.

References

External links

Swedish musical groups
Musical groups established in 1998